Ilhan New (유일한 柳一韓, January 15, 1895March 11, 1971) was a Korean independence activist and entrepreneur. He founded La Choy Food Products, Inc. and Yuhan Co, Ltd. His original Korean name was Ilhyeong New.

Early life
New was born in 1895 in Pyongyang among nine brothers and sisters, and emigrated to the United States at the age of 9. In America he gained a degree from the University of Michigan and founded La Choy Foods in 1922.

Yuhan Corporation
New returned to Korea in 1926, where he established the Yuhan Corporation under the notion that “Only healthy people can reclaim their sovereignty.” Believing that it was the duty and responsibility of a business to develop itself for the prosperity of all of society, New traded Yuhan in the stock exchange for the first time in the Korean pharmaceutical industry and started a program of employee ownership. He was involved in the establishment of Mangho-Kun and participating in the NAPKO Project, the Country reclamation operation initiated by the United States Office of Strategic Services. In 1943, he authored a booklet entitled "Korea and the Pacific War" which was based on a report he prepared for the Office of Strategic Services (OSS). He also founded several schools.

Death and legacy
When he died at the age of 77, he donated all his wealth to the public foundation named the Korean Society and Education Aid Trust Fund. 
Jae-Ra New, Il-han New's first-born daughter, also contributed her entire fortune to a Korean public foundation named the Yuhan Foundation when she died in 1991.

The Yuhan Foundation and Yuhan School he founded are active in a variety of public welfare activities, scholarship programs and education for students. These activities are supported by the Yuhan Corporation's high dividend policy.

References

External links 
 Yuhan Corporation Homepage

1895 births
1971 deaths
Korean independence activists
20th-century South Korean businesspeople
Korean revolutionaries
People from Pyongyang
Food and drink company founders
University and college founders
Korean company founders
Pharmaceutical company founders
University of Michigan alumni
20th-century Korean businesspeople